Cromby station was a former train station in the settlement of Cromby, Pennsylvania. It served as a station for the Pennsylvania Railroad. It was demolished in 1967.

References 

Former Pennsylvania Railroad stations
Former railway stations in Chester County, Pennsylvania